Jarosław Wierczuk (born January 6, 1977) is a former racing driver. One of the pioneers of Polish involvement  in international sport racing.

Wierczuk was born in Warsaw, Poland. In 2001 he graduated from the Faculty of Management in Warsaw.

His racing driver career started with karting at the age of 15. After a three-year internship, the first professional team in Poland (founded by Krzysztof Woźniak), offered him starting positions. He took part in the prestigious Central European Zone Championships, and at the same time in the Championships of Austria, then in The German Formula Three Championships. He competed with drivers like: Ralf Schumacher, Nick Heidfeld and Jarno Trulli. He proceeded onto the Italian Formula 3000 (the equivalent of today's FIA Formula 2 Championship) and Formula Nippon.

He participated in tests for the Formula 1 Forti Corse team. Wierczuk appeared as a Formula 1 expert on Canal+ and also on other Polish television racing programmes. Currently he also writes commentaries on Formula 1 for popular Polish websites.

In 2013 he founded the Wierczuk Race Promotion Foundation which supports the most talented drivers in their careers.

He is married to Emilia and has a daughter, Julia.

Complete Formula Nippon results 
(key) (Races in bold indicate pole position) (Races in italics indicate fastest lap)

References

External links
Poles in Formula One  (pl)

Polish racing drivers
Sportspeople from Warsaw
German Formula Three Championship drivers
Formula Nippon drivers
Auto GP drivers
1977 births
Living people
Dandelion Racing drivers
Josef Kaufmann Racing drivers
Durango drivers